The Dahuofang Water Tunnel, located in Liaoning Province, China is an  tunnel eight meters in diameter which provides water from the Dahuofang Reservoir to the cities of Shenyang, Fushun, Liaoyang, Anshan, Panjin, Yingkou, and Dalian. , it is the third longest tunnel in the world. Boring of the tunnel began in September 2006, was completed in April 2009, and cost 5.2 billion yuan (about $750 million).

See also
 South–North Water Transfer Project

References

Tunnels